Federal Science and Technical College, Usi-Ekiti is a technical secondary college in north Ekiti, Nigeria.

The secondary school was established in 2002 by the federal government of Nigeria and is youngest unity school in South West Nigeria.

Notes 

2002 establishments in Nigeria
Secondary schools in Nigeria
Educational institutions established in 2002
Government schools in Nigeria

External links 
school website